AB-PICA is a potent agonist for the CB1 receptor (EC50 = 12 nM) and CB2 receptor (EC50 = 12 nM).

See also 

 5F-AB-PINACA
 5F-ADB
 5F-AMB
 5F-APINACA
 5F-CUMYL-PINACA
 AB-CHFUPYCA
 AB-FUBINACA
 ADB-CHMINACA
 ADB-FUBINACA
 ADB-PINACA
 ADBICA
 APICA
 APINACA
 MDMB-CHMICA
 PX-3

References 

Cannabinoids
Designer drugs
Indolecarboxamides